Tim Burns (born July 10, 1947) is an English-born Canadian soccer player who played as a midfielder.

Career 
Burns played in the North American Soccer League with Toronto Metros in 1972. He would play with the Metros for four seasons in the NASL. For the remainder of the 1975 season he played in the National Soccer League with Toronto Homer. In 1976, he returned to the National Soccer League to play with Toronto Italia. He was called to the Canada Olympic soccer team camp in 1976.

References  

1947 births
Living people
Canadian soccer players
Toronto Blizzard (1971–1984) players
Toronto Italia players
North American Soccer League (1968–1984) players
Canadian National Soccer League players
Association football midfielders